Juhi may refer to:
 Juhi (name), an Indian feminine name
 Juhi, Iran, a village in Khuzestan Province, Iran